The Boise Valley Railroad  is a shortline railroad in Idaho connecting Nampa with Boise and Wilder. It is owned and operated by Watco.

History
On 23 November 2009, the railroad began operations, running over an 11-mile(18 km) line between Wilder and Caldwell and a 25-mile(40 km) line between Nampa and Boise, with the two lines connected via trackage rights on the Union Pacific. Watco purchased the line from Idaho Northern & Pacific Railroad. Watco took over operations and leased the line to Union Pacific. Operations for both branches are based at Nampa Yard in Nampa where cars are interchanged to the Union Pacific.

Wilder Branch 
The Wilder Branch begins at Caldwell and goes west to Wilder and switches several packing houses. The branch is 11 miles long.

Boise Branch and Nampa Industrial Lead 
The 25 mile Boise Branch goes from Nampa to Boise Airport and is Union Pacific's former main line into Boise. The City of Boise closed the Boise Yard in 1989 but kept the branch active until 1996 when the eastern half was abandoned with the cessation of Amtrak's Pioneer. BVRR also switches the Nampa Industrial Lead which comes off the Boise Branch at Nampa Junction and goes out to Amalgamated Sugar Company at the end of the branch.

References

External links
Official website

Idaho railroads
Watco
2009 establishments in Idaho